Thomas Whitehead (December 27, 1825 – July 1, 1901) was a nineteenth-century politician, lawyer, editor and merchant from Virginia.

Biography
Born in Lovingston, Virginia, Whitehead received a limited education as a child, later engaged in mercantile pursuits, studied law and was admitted to the bar in 1849, commencing practice in Amherst, Virginia. During the Civil War, he served in the Confederate Army as captain of Company E, 2nd Virginia Cavalry from 1862 to 1865, was twice wounded and was promoted to Major on April 15, 1865. Afterwards, he was elected to the Virginia Senate, but Reconstruction prevented him from taking seat. Whitehead was elected prosecuting attorney for Amherst County, Virginia in 1866 and again in 1869, resigning in 1873. He was elected as a Democrat to the United States House of Representatives in 1872, serving from 1873 to 1875 and afterwards was editor of the Lynchburg News in 1876 and of the Lynchburg Advance in 1880. Whitehead resumed practicing law and was elected commissioner of agriculture for Virginia in 1888, serving until his death on July 1, 1901 near Lynchburg, Virginia. He was interred in Spring Hill Cemetery in Lynchburg.

Electoral history

1872; Whitehead was elected to the U.S. House of Representatives with 51.40% of the vote, defeating Independent J. Foote Johnson.

External links
 Retrieved on 2008-02-14

1825 births
1901 deaths
People from Lovingston, Virginia
Virginia lawyers
American newspaper editors
Confederate States Army officers
People of Virginia in the American Civil War
Politicians from Lynchburg, Virginia
Democratic Party members of the United States House of Representatives from Virginia
19th-century American politicians
Journalists from Virginia